Samuel Dumoulin (born 20 August 1980) is a French former professional road bicycle racer, who rode professionally between 2002 and 2019 for the ,  and  teams. He now works as a directeur sportif for UCI ProTeam .

Career
Dumoulin rode as an amateur for the TCCT (Tonic cyclo club of Ternay). He won the national youth championship in 1996, then the espoir (young professional) Paris–Tours and Paris-Auxerre in 2001.

He dropped out of the 2004 Tour de France when he crashed after hitting a dog. Recovery took him four months and he did not race for the rest of the season.

Major results

2001
 1st Stage 1 Tour de l'Ain
 8th Road race, UEC European Under-23 Road Championships
2002
 1st Stage 4 Tour de l'Avenir
2003
 1st  Overall Tour de Normandie
 1st Tro-Bro Léon
 2nd Overall Tour de l'Ain
 3rd Overall Tour de l'Avenir
1st Stages 4 & 10
2004
 1st Tro-Bro Léon
2005
 1st Stage 2 Critérium du Dauphiné Libéré
 2nd Overall Tour du Limousin
1st Stage 2
 7th Trophée des Grimpeurs
 9th Paris–Camembert
2006
 1st Route Adélie
 3rd Grand Prix de Plumelec-Morbihan
 6th Overall Tour Down Under
 7th Vattenfall Cyclassics
2007
 8th Trophée des Grimpeurs
2008
 1st Stage 3 Tour de France
 1st Stage 2 Circuit de la Sarthe
 Tour du Poitou-Charentes
1st Stages 2 & 5
 4th Tour de Vendée
 5th Grand Prix d'Ouverture La Marseillaise
 9th Vattenfall Cyclassics
 10th Grand Prix de Fourmies
2009
 1st  Points classification Volta a Catalunya
 1st Stage 2 Tour du Limousin
 3rd Gran Premio dell'Insubria-Lugano
 7th GP Ouest–France
2010
 1st  Overall Étoile de Bessèges
1st Stage 3
 1st Gran Premio dell'Insubria-Lugano
 1st Stage 6 Volta a Catalunya
 3rd Grand Prix d'Ouverture La Marseillaise
 4th Overall La Tropicale Amissa Bongo
1st Stage 1
 8th Overall Circuit de la Sarthe
1st Stage 3
2011
 1st Overall Paris–Corrèze
1st Stage 1
 Volta a Catalunya
1st Stages 5 & 7
 1st Stage 3 Étoile de Bessèges
 3rd Hel van het Mergelland
 3rd London–Surrey Cycle Classic
 7th Overall Tour du Haut Var
1st Stage 1
 7th Gran Premio dell'Insubria-Lugano
 9th Paris–Bourges
2012
 1st Overall French Road Cycling Cup
 1st Grand Prix d'Ouverture La Marseillaise
 2nd Tour du Finistère
 2nd Grand Prix de Plumelec-Morbihan
 2nd Polynormande
 4th Tour du Doubs
 5th Grand Prix d'Isbergues
 6th Overall Tour de Luxembourg
 6th Paris–Bourges
 7th Boucles de l'Aulne
 7th Tour de Vendée
 9th GP Ouest–France
2013
 1st Overall French Road Cycling Cup
 1st Grand Prix de Plumelec-Morbihan
 1st Stage 5 Étoile de Bessèges
 2nd Grand Prix d'Ouverture La Marseillaise
 2nd Tour de Vendée
 3rd GP Ouest–France
 3rd Paris–Bourges
 6th Overall Tour du Haut Var
 6th Overall Four Days of Dunkirk
 7th Les Boucles du Sud Ardèche
 7th Paris–Camembert
 7th Grand Prix d'Isbergues
 7th Paris–Tours
 10th Brussels Cycling Classic
2014
 2nd Overall Tour du Haut Var
 2nd Paris–Camembert
 3rd Grand Prix d'Ouverture La Marseillaise
 4th Overall Four Days of Dunkirk
 7th Grand Prix de la Somme
 7th Grand Prix de Plumelec-Morbihan
 7th Grand Prix d'Isbergues
 9th Tour du Doubs
2015
 1st La Drôme Classic
 3rd Paris–Camembert
 5th Grand Prix de Denain
 6th La Roue Tourangelle
 7th Grand Prix de Fourmies
 8th Down Under Classic
 8th Route Adélie
 9th Grand Prix de Plumelec-Morbihan
 9th Paris–Bourges
 10th Grand Prix d'Isbergues
2016
 1st Overall French Road Cycling Cup
 1st La Roue Tourangelle
 1st Grand Prix de Plumelec-Morbihan
 1st Boucles de l'Aulne
 1st Tour du Doubs
 2nd Tour du Finistère
 2nd Tour de Vendée
 3rd Route Adélie
 4th Road race, UEC European Road Championships
 4th Paris–Camembert
 4th Polynormande
 8th Paris–Bourges
 9th Grand Prix de Fourmies
 10th Grand Prix de la Somme
2017
 1st Stage 1 Tour du Haut Var
 2nd Paris–Camembert
 3rd Grand Prix de Plumelec-Morbihan
 5th Classic Loire-Atlantique
 9th La Drôme Classic
 10th Grand Prix d'Ouverture La Marseillaise
2018
 2nd La Roue Tourangelle
 3rd Grand Prix de Plumelec-Morbihan
 4th La Drôme Classic
 5th Grand Prix d'Isbergues
 6th Polynormande
 7th Route Adélie
 9th Classic Loire-Atlantique
2019
 8th La Roue Tourangelle
 9th Grand Prix de Denain

Grand Tour general classification results timeline

References

External links

1980 births
Living people
People from Vénissieux
French male cyclists
French Tour de France stage winners
Sportspeople from Lyon Metropolis
Cyclists from Auvergne-Rhône-Alpes